San Roque Dam may refer to:
 San Roque Dam (Philippines), a dam on the Agno River in Luzon, Philippines
 The dam of the artificial San Roque Lake in Córdoba, Argentina